East Tsim Sha Tsui & King's Park  (尖東及京士柏), formerly King's Park from 1994 to 2015, is one of the 20 constituencies in the Yau Tsim Mong District in Hong Kong.

The constituency elects one district councillor to the Yau Tsim Mong District Council, with an election every four years.

East Tsim Sha Tsui & King's Park constituency is loosely based on the King's Park area and East Tsim Sha Tsui in Kowloon with estimated population of 15,185.

Councillors represented

Election results

2010s

2000s

1990s

References

Tsim Sha Tsui East
King's Park, Hong Kong
Constituencies of Hong Kong
Constituencies of Yau Tsim Mong District Council
1994 establishments in Hong Kong
Constituencies established in 1994